Monolithos is a Greek village on the island of Rhodes, South Aegean region, belonging to the municipal unit of Attavyros. It is located 8 km south-east of Apolakkia and 28 km from Prasonisi.

Overview
Outside the village is the medieval Castle, built on top of a 100m rock. This castle was built in 1480 by the Knights of Saint John to protect the island from attacks. In fact, this castle was never conquered. The Castle of Monolithos is widely ruined today but it offers great views of the sea and the two islets opposite to it. Inside the Castle, there is a small working chapel dedicated to Agios Panteleimon (Saint Pantaleon). Access to the castle is by a staircase cut into the rock. The steps, whilst not particularly steep, are quite slippery simply due to the numbers of visitors wearing them away. On the climb up to the top, you are likely to see hundreds, if not thousands, of small piles of rocks from 3–10 in number. These piles are left there by the visitors as a form of a memento.

References

External links

 The village of Monolithos on RhodesGuide.com
  Rhodes Monolithos: Information and pictures of Monolithos Castle on Rhodes
 Rhodes Island at Greeka.com
 Images of Monolithos at Flickr

Populated places in Rhodes